Global Mall Zhonghe is a shopping mall in Zhonghe District, New Taipei, Taiwan that opened in December 2005. It is the first store of Global Mall.

Gallery

See also
 List of tourist attractions in Taiwan
 Global Mall Taoyuan A8
 Global Mall Xinzuoying Station
 Global Mall Pingtung

References

External links

2005 establishments in Taiwan
Shopping malls in New Taipei
Shopping malls established in 2005